Jonathan Goes Country is Jonathan Richman's third studio album in which he covers five songs from artists Porter Wagoner, Marty Robbins and Skeeter Davis. Richman also recorded original songs. Tom Brumley, pedal steel guitarist for The Buckaroos, is featured on the opening track.

Track listing
All tracks composed by Jonathan Richman; except where indicated
"Since She Started to Ride" – 2:31
"Reno" – 3:58
"You're the One for Me" – 3:09
"Your Good Girl's Gonna Go Bad" (Billy Sherrill, Glenn Sutton) – 2:58
"I Must Be King" – 2:25
"You're Crazy for Taking the Bus" – 2:29
"Rodeo Wind" (Ronee Blakley) – 2:15
"Corner Store" – 2:59
"The Neighbors" – 2:42
"Man Walks Among Us" (Marty Robbins) – 2:19
"I Can't Stay Mad at You" (Gerry Goffin, Carole King) – 1:33
"Satisfied Mind" (Jack Rhodes, Red Hayes) – 1:52

Personnel
Jonathan Richman - guitar, vocals
D. Clinton Thompson - electric guitar, acoustic guitar, percussion, backing vocals
Tom Brumley - steel guitar
Lou Whitney - bass guitar
Joe Terry - piano, backing vocals
David Byrd - piano
Ned Claflin - accordion, backing vocals
Ned Wilkinson - backing vocals
Bobby Lloyd Hicks - drums, backing vocals
Ron Gremp - drums
Nick Sibley - harmonica, backing vocals
Jody Ross - duet vocals on "The Neighbors"

References

Jonathan Richman albums
1990 albums
Rounder Records albums
Country albums by American artists